Olga is a waterfront unincorporated community on Orcas Island in San Juan County, Washington, United States.

History
Olga was founded in 1860, after William Moore homesteaded the region. The Olga post office opened in 1890, with Hibbard Stone serving as postmaster. Olga is named after the mother of the first storekeeper of the area, John Ohlert.

Climate

References

External links
 http://www.historylink.org/index.cfm?DisplayPage=output.cfm&file_id=10240

Unincorporated communities in San Juan County, Washington
Unincorporated communities in Washington (state)